Lincoln station is a disused train station in Lincoln, Nebraska, United States. Service ended in 2012 after the construction of the Pinnacle Bank Arena led to a new station being built several blocks to the west.  The station, also known as Burlington Northern Railroad Depot, has been converted into an antique mall.

See also
Lincoln station (Nebraska)

References

External links
Lincoln Amtrak Station (USA RailGuide -- TrainWeb)

Former Amtrak stations in Nebraska
Repurposed railway stations in the United States
Amtrak station
Former Chicago, Burlington and Quincy Railroad stations
Railway stations in the United States opened in 1926
Railway stations closed in 2012